José María García Lavilla, also known as José María, is a Spanish former footballer who played as a forward and former coach.

He played for Real Oviedo, RCD Espanyol and the Spain national football team.

References

1942 births
People from Siero
Spanish footballers
Footballers from Asturias
Association football forwards
Spain international footballers
La Liga players
Segunda División players
Real Oviedo players
RCD Espanyol footballers
Real Oviedo managers
Living people
Catalonia international guest footballers
Spanish football managers